Glasson Dock, also known as Glasson, is a village in Lancashire, England, south of Lancaster at the mouth of the River Lune. In 2011, it had a population of around 600.

History
Glasson was originally a small farming and fishing community (which is now known as Old Glasson and Brows-saltcote); the village of Overton lies directly across the river from Glasson.

In 1779, the Lancaster Port Commission decided to build a dock at Glasson because of the difficulties of navigating up the River Lune to the port at Lancaster. Land was purchased in 1780, with work commencing by 1782. A pier was constructed but there were problems and the west wall began to bulge. In August 1782, the commissioners asked Henry Berry, who was employed as the engineer for the Liverpool docks, to arbitrate in the dispute with the contractor, and to design a dock, to be located by the pier. Berry was unable to do so, as he was so busy, and so the engineer Thomas Morris was asked instead. He produced plans in November 1783, for a project which involved rebuilding the bulging wall, and the construction of another short pier from the opposite bank of the river, so that gates could be fitted between the two. The estimated cost was £2,700, and Mr. Fisher was appointed as the new contractor, with Morris acting as engineer for a salary of £100 per year. Construction was finished by March 1787, when the dock opened, with Morris remaining as engineer until December. The dock was well equipped and could hold up to 25 merchant ships.

In 1792, with the construction of the Lancaster Canal underway, thought was given to building a connection between it and merchant shipping. John Rennie's plans for a Glasson branch formed the basis for the Private Act of Parliament which was obtained in May 1793. However, after no work took place, it was not until 1819 that the plans were revived, when another Private Bill was passed to raise additional finance for the project. The estimated cost of the branch was £34,608, and work began in 1823. The  branch dropped through  from Galgate, and the basic engineering was completed in December 1825, but financial difficulties meant that warehousing and wharves could not be constructed at first, and so the build-up of trade was slow. However, by 1830 over 10,000 tons of goods passed through the dock, most of it passing on to the canal. The first such boat to do so was a schooner called Sprightly, which carried slate to Preston in May 1826. Incoming trade included slate, timber, potatoes and grain, while coal was exported through the port to Ulverston, North Wales and Ireland.

As the ships using the dock did not require significant amounts of local labour, the settlement around the dock did not grow significantly. Many of the buildings in the village were built in the 19th century, including Christ Church, which was built in 1840, although expanded in 1931–32. A shipyard and Customs House were built in 1834, a Watch House in 1836, and a Dry Dock in 1841. The shipyards were largely concerned with ship repair rather than shipbuilding, eventually closing in 1968, with the dry dock filled in a year later.

The quay was connected to the railway network at Lancaster in 1883, by a 5 mile branch line that operated until the cessation of passenger services on 5 July 1930. Goods rail traffic continued until 7 September 1964. The trackbed of the disused branchline is now a linear park and cycleway that forms part of the larger Bay Cycle Way.

A limited amount of commercial traffic still uses the dock, with outbound shipments including coal for the Isle of Man and the Western Isles of Scotland, and incoming cargoes including animal foodstuffs and fertilizer, which are stored in the sheds located on the dock side.

Ship building
A number of ships were built in Glasson Dock:
 Anna (1835)
 Carrie Bell (1862) built by Matthew Simpson
 Englishman (1864) built by Matthew Simpson
 Dairy Maid (1867) built by Matthew Simpson
 James & Mary  (1867) built by Matthew Simpson
 Red Rose (1879) built by Matthew Simpson

Operations
Maritime vessel entering the dock can only do so during limited tidal windows because the River Lune contains very little water at low tide, and mooring is not possible outside the dock entrance. As the channel varies its course, shipping can only safely navigate with high tides. The dock gates are only opened for a period starting 45 minutes before high water and ending at high water. The entrance to the dock is controlled by traffic lights and travelling down river is only safe for an hour immediately after high water.

The dock is connected by a lock to Glasson Basin Marina, which has mooring facilities for 220 boats, and a wide range of boating services including chandlery, facilities for the repair of boats, a wet dock, slipway and a hoist with a capacity of 35 tons for cranage.

The Victoria Inn
The owners of the Victoria Inn, then one of the village's two public houses (the other being the Dalton Arms), submitted plans in 2019 to change the use of the premises to having a bar on the ground floor only, with two holiday flats on the first floor and two residential flats on the second floor. The building has Grade II listed status. It is constructed of rendered stone with a slate roof, it has three storeys and a symmetrical front of three bays.  In the outer bays are two-storey canted bay windows.  The windows in the lower two floors are sashes, and the central doorway has a plain surround.

Gallery

See also

Scheduled monuments in Lancashire
Listed buildings in Thurnham, Lancashire
Canals of the United Kingdom
History of the British canal system
Waring & Gillow

References

Sources

External links

Glassondock.co.uk

Geography of the City of Lancaster
Villages in Lancashire
Lancaster Canal
Populated coastal places in Lancashire
Morecambe Bay
Scheduled monuments in Lancashire